Kheri Town railway station is a small railway station in Lakhimpur Kheri district, Uttar Pradesh. Its code is KITN. It serves Kheri city. The station consists of one platform, which is not well sheltered. It lacks many facilities, including water and sanitation.

References

Railway stations in Lakhimpur Kheri district
Lucknow NER railway division